The following is a list of North Dakota State Treasurers. The office has always been on a party affiliated ballot, and was a two-year term office until 1964. Since then, State Treasurers have been elected to four-year terms. The State Treasurer was prohibited from serving more than two consecutive terms until the prohibition was removed by a vote in 1996.

List

See also
North Dakota State Treasurer

Notes

External links
North Dakota State Treasurer website

State Treasurers